Bosse Johansson (born 1965) is the CEO at Swedbank Sjuhärad in Borås. He also has been a Chairman of IF Elfsborg since 2004, where he replaced Sture Svensson after his resignment. He was chosen along with Elfsborg's new Sporting Director Stefan Andreasson.

References

1965 births
Living people
IF Elfsborg directors and chairmen